General elections were held in Malaysia on 20 and 21 October 1990. Voting took place in all 180 parliamentary constituencies of Malaysia, each electing one Member of Parliament to the Dewan Rakyat, the dominant house of Parliament. State elections also took place in 351 state constituencies in 11 (out of 13, except Sabah and Sarawak) states of Malaysia on the same day.

The result was a victory for the Barisan Nasional (BN) at the federal level and 10 of the 11 state elections. The opposition alliance Angkatan Perpaduan Ummah (APU) won a landslide victory over BN in the state of Kelantan, winning all 39 state assembly seats.

At the state level, the BN won 10 out of the 11 state elections. The APU won all 39 state seats in Kelantan to form the state government, with 24 seats going to PAS and 15 for Semangat 46.

Background
The elections marked the first after United Malays National Organisation (UMNO) party split and the subsequent constitutional crisis in 1988. The reconstituted UMNO Baru (New UMNO), led by incumbent Prime Minister Mahathir Mohamad, and the newly formed Semangat 46 (S46), led by Tengku Razaleigh Hamzah, contested for the first time in the elections.

It also marked the first time in country general election history when a credible, multi-ethnic coalition have been formed the challenge the dominance of Barisan Nasional. This also lead the country political scene from a dominant party system into two party system. The Muslim opposition parties, Pan-Malaysian Islamic Party (PAS), Semangat 46, Barisan Jemaah Islamiah Se-Malaysia (BERJASA) and Parti Hizbul Muslimin Malaysia (HAMIM) teamed up to form the Angkatan Perpaduan Ummah (APU). On the other hand, Semangat 46, Democratic Action Party (DAP) and Parti Bersatu Sabah (PBS), which withdrew from the Barisan Nasional (BN) at the eleventh hour of the general election, teamed up as Gagasan Rakyat. However, these two opposition alliances cooperated in the election but not openly due to the sensitivity of the secular DAP and the Islamic PAS working together.

Results
At the federal level, the BN coalition under the leadership of incumbent Prime Minister Mahathir Mohamad won 127 of the 180 parliament seats to form the federal government.

By state

Johor

Kedah

Kelantan

Kuala Lumpur

Labuan

Malacca

Negeri Sembilan

Pahang

Penang

Perak

Perlis

Sabah

Sarawak

Selangor

Terengganu

See also
1990 Malaysian state elections

Notes

References

Arah Aliran Malaysia: Penilaian Pilihan Raya satu himpunan kerta kertas 62-halaman daripada Institut Penyelidikan Asia Tenggara selepas pilihan raya 1999.

General elections in Malaysia
Malaysia
General election
Malaysia